Fleinhausen is a village of the municipality of Dinkelscherben in the western part of the Bavarian district of Augsburg in Germany. 

Located on the western bank of the Zusam River, Fleinhausen is approximately 1.5 miles northwest of Dinkelscherben. Along with the nearby village of Grünenbaindt, has approximately 360 inhabitants.

Notable residents
 Julius Streicher (1885-1946), prominent Nazi prior to World War II, founder and publisher of anti-Semitic Der Stürmer newspaper, executed for war crimes

External links
Fleinhausen Website with Twitter Feed 
Fleinhausen official website 
Dinkelscherben website 

Augsburg (district)